Shchegolikha is a rural locality (a village) in Tiginskoye Rural Settlement, Vozhegodsky District, Vologda Oblast, Russia. The population was 32 as of 2002.

Geography 
Shchegolikha is located 21 km west of Vozhega (the district's administrative centre) by road.  Malaya is the nearest rural locality.

References 

Rural localities in Vozhegodsky District